Cattleya reginae, often known as Laelia reginae or Sophronitis reginae, is a species of orchid endemic to the Serra da Caraça mountains in the state of Minas Gerais of Brazil.

References

External links 

reginae
Endemic orchids of Brazil
Orchids of Minas Gerais